Clarke City may refer to:
Clarke City, California, former name of Greenfield, California
Clarke City, Quebec